Zhenxiang may refer to:

Zhenxiang, Heilongjiang (祯祥), a town in Qinggang County, Heilongjiang, China
Angel's Dream, a 2000 Singaporean TV series
The Other Truth, a 2011 Hong Kong TV series